Neora is a village in the state of Chhattisgarh, India.

References

Villages in Raipur district